The NW 39th Street Enclave, also known as "The Strip," "May-Penn," "39th & Penn" or simply "39th Street" is a prominent lesbian, gay, bisexual and transgender (LGBT) district in Oklahoma City, Oklahoma. The area is located along NW 39th Street in the city's northwest quadrant, one block west of Pennsylvania Avenue.

Northwest 39th Street Enclave is home to many of Oklahoma's most popular gay and lesbian bars and nightclubs, in addition to a number of retail stores, eateries, and apartment complexes catering to Oklahoma City's LGBT community. While Oklahoma City's openly gay population is relatively average for a city of its size, the NW 39th Street Enclave is widely regarded as the largest gay and lesbian district in the Great Plains and central regions of the United States, and one of the largest in the South.

The NW 39th Street district attracts large numbers of gay and lesbian tourists, particularly on weekends, from elsewhere in Oklahoma and from the surrounding states of Arkansas, Colorado, Kansas, Missouri, New Mexico, and Texas. The neighborhood is also a popular stopping point for cross-country LGBT travelers. 

Most of the district's attractions are concentrated around or near the District Hotel (which had a long history as the Habana Inn before being briefly rebranded as the Hotel Habana). This hotel, promoted as "Oklahoma City’s renowned wonderland for adults" and "a multi-venue experience," features a variety of guest rooms, a lounge bar, nightclub, billiards, darts and two pools, and also promotes a forthcoming restaurant and business center. The hotel, which requires all guests to be 21 years or older to be on its property, hosts various LGBT events and gatherings.

References

Gay villages in the United States
LGBT culture in Oklahoma
Neighborhoods in Oklahoma City
Entertainment districts in the United States